was a Japanese composer.

Works, editions and recordings
 Quatre mouvements parodiques (1933/36)
 Metropolis, ballet (1934)
 Création, ballet (1940)
 The 47 Ronin, film (1941)
 Symphonic suite "Song of Manchuria" (1941)
 Chantes de Java (1942)
 Voice of Autumn, ballet (1950)
 Cantata "Prayer for Peace" (1950)
 Divertissement pour 13 exécutants (1955)
 Trois mouvements pour un ballet imaginaire (1956)
 Symphonic Picture Scroll "Tokyo" (1957)
 Four Japanese Folk Songs (1957)
 I. Ina, II. Sailing Out, III. Yanshichi of Yabe. (日本の笛 "Japan's flute") Yoshikazu Mera. BIS
  (A dove's day off). Used on Nippon Television's station identification. Was later recorded in 1978 by  Yomiuri Nippon Symphony Orchestra for Nippon TV’s 25th anniversary.

References

1907 births
1959 deaths
20th-century classical composers
20th-century Japanese composers
20th-century Japanese male musicians
Japanese classical composers
Japanese male classical composers
Musicians from Akita Prefecture
People from Akita (city)
Kunitachi College of Music alumni
Kagoshima University alumni